Huascacocha or Wask'aqucha (Quechua wask'a rectangle / long, qucha lake, "rectangle lake" or "long lake", Hispanicized spelling Huascacocha) is a lake in Peru located in the Lima Region, Yauyos Province, Ayaviri District, Yauyos quinches District. Huascacocha lies between the mountains Huayna Cotoni and Qutuni in the north and Llongote in the south, southeast of the lake Tikllaqucha.

References 

Lakes of Peru
Lakes of Lima Region